Fredericktown may refer to a location in the United States:

Fredericktown, Kentucky
Fredericktown, Maryland
Fredericktown, Missouri
Fredericktown, Ohio
Fredericktown, Columbiana County, Ohio
Fredericktown, Pennsylvania

See also
Fredericton
Frederickton (disambiguation)